Behenu was an ancient Egyptian queen of the Sixth Dynasty. She is thought to have been the wife of either Pepi I or of Pepi II.

The remnants of her pyramid were first discovered in 2007, and news of the discovery of her burial chamber was made public in March 2010. 
The complex was discovered in the vicinity of the pyramid of the Pepi II, and it is thought that she was "most probably" the wife of this pharaoh, but no inscription has been uncovered that would positively link her to him.

A set of Pyramid Texts was uncovered along with the burial chamber.  This is only the second known instance of these ancient religious texts being used in association with a Queen instead of the pharaoh.

References

24th-century BC women
23rd-century BC women
22nd-century BC women
Queens consort of the Sixth Dynasty of Egypt